Yangcheon Hyanggyo Station is a railway station on Line 9 of the Seoul Subway.

This station is named from near this station, Yangcheon Hyanggyo, the only hyanggyo in Seoul.

Station layout

External links

Railway stations opened in 2009
Seoul Metropolitan Subway stations
Metro stations in Gangseo District, Seoul